Veronica Louise Cosgrave (11 March 1926 – 15 September 2016) was an Irish public figure as the wife of Liam Cosgrave, who served as Taoiseach from 1973 to 1977.

Early life
Veronica Louise Osborne was born in Naas, County Kildare, on 11 March 1926. Her mother was the former Helen Cunningham. Her father, Joseph W.  Osborne, was a horse trainer based at Craddoxtown House. Her brother Paddy Osborne was also a horse trainer.

Political life
Osborne married Liam Cosgrave on 16 April 1952. At the time, Cosgrave was a government minister; he rose to the position of Leader of Fine Gael and Taoiseach in 1973. She accompanied him to the United States for a state visit in 1976, during the American Bicentennial. Vera Cosgrave also worked in public relations.

Personal life
Vera and Liam Cosgrave had three children, including Liam T. Cosgrave, a Fine Gael politician. She died in Dublin on 15 September 2016, aged 90 years. Her gravesite is at Goldenbridge Cemetery in Inchicore.

References

1926 births
2016 deaths
People from County Kildare
Spouses and partners of Taoisigh
Cosgrave family
Burials at Goldenbridge Cemetery